Oxfordshire was a county constituency of the House of Commons of the Parliament of England then of the Parliament of Great Britain from 1707 to 1800 and of the Parliament of the United Kingdom from 1801 to 1885. It was represented by two Members of Parliament. In 1832 this was increased to three Members of Parliament. The constituency was abolished in 1885, being split into three single member divisions.

The bitterly contested Oxfordshire election of 1754 was the main inspiration for Hogarth's famous series of paintings and engravings, The Election.

Boundaries
The constituency comprised the whole of the historic county of Oxfordshire, in the northern part of South East England. (Although Oxfordshire contained three parliamentary boroughs for part of this period – Oxford (from 1295), Woodstock (or New Woodstock) (1302–1555 and from 1571) and Banbury (from 1554) – each of which elected MPs in their own right, these were not excluded from the county constituency, and owning property within the borough could confer a vote at the county election. The Oxford University constituency was also often listed as an Oxfordshire constituency, but was non-territorial and had no effect on the right to vote in the county.)

There were minor boundary changes at the time of the Great Reform Act in 1832, when five parishes or parts of parishes were transferred to other counties while six parishes or parts of parishes were added.

In 1885 the representation of the county was changed from one three member constituency to three single member divisions. Banbury and Woodstock ceased to be parliamentary boroughs but the same names were used for two county divisions. The three new county constituencies were Banbury (or the North division); Woodstock (or the Mid division) and Henley (or the South division).

Members of Parliament

MPs 1290–1640

MPs 1640–1832

MPs 1832–1885

Elections
The county franchise, from 1430, was held by the adult male owners of freehold land valued at 40 shillings or more. The bloc vote electoral system was used in two seat elections and first past the post for single member by-elections. Each elector had as many votes as there were seats to be filled. Votes had to be cast by a spoken declaration, in public, at the hustings, which took place in Oxford. The expense and difficulty of voting at only one location in the county, together with the lack of a secret ballot contributed to the corruption and intimidation of electors, which was widespread in the unreformed British political system.

The expense, to candidates and their supporters, of contested elections encouraged the leading families of the county to agree on the candidates to be returned unopposed whenever possible. Contested county elections were therefore unusual. The Tory Dukes of Marlborough, dominated the county from their seat at Blenheim Palace. One seat was usually held by a Spencer, the other by a local family acceptable to the Duke. Between 1700 and 1826 there was only one contest.

Election results
Note on percentage change calculations: Where there was only one candidate of a party in successive elections, for the same number of seats, change is calculated on the party percentage vote. Where there was more than one candidate, in one or both successive elections for the same number of seats, then change is calculated on the individual percentage vote.

Note on sources: The information for the election results given below is taken from Stooks Smith 1715–1754, Namier and Brooke 1754–1790 and Stooks Smith 1790–1832. From 1832 the principal source was Craig, with additional or different information from Stooks Smith included.

Election results 1715–1800

Elections in the 1710s

 Death of Clerke

 Death of Jenkinson

Elections in the 1720s
 Death of Herbert

Elections in the 1730s

 Death of Stapleton

 Death of Perrot

Elections in the 1740s

 Succession of Quarendon to the peerage as The 3rd Earl of Lichfield

Elections in the 1750s

 Wenman was a Peer of Ireland. There was a double return (of all four candidates) after the most hotly contested county election of the century. The disputed election was decided by the House of Commons on petition, with Parker and Turner being declared duly elected on 23 April 1755.

Elections in the 1760s

 Seat vacated on Spencer being appointed Ranger of Windsor Forest.

 Seat vacated on Spencer being appointed Comptroller of the Household.

 Note (April 1763): By-election in Stooks Smith, but not in Namier and Brooke.

 Wenman was a peer of Ireland

Elections in the 1770s

 Seat vacated on the appointment of Spencer as Treasurer of the Chamber

Elections in the 1780s

 Seat vacated on the appointment of Spencer as a Vice Treasurer of Ireland

Elections in the 1790s

Election results 1801–1885

Elections in the 1800s
 Seat vacated on the appointment of Spencer as Postmaster General

Elections in the 1810s

 Creation of Spencer as 1st Baron Churchill

Elections in the 1820s

 Death of Fane

Note (1826): Stooks Smith records that the polls were open for three days

Elections in the 1830s

 Note (1831): Stooks Smith records that the polls were open for three days
 Representation increased to three seats under the Reform Act 1832

 Note (1835): For this election Stooks Smith records the number of registered electors as 5,164 instead of the number given by Craig used above.

Elections in the 1840s

 Note (1841): Stooks Smith records the number of registered electors as 5,721 instead of the number given by Craig used above.

Elections in the 1850s
 Seat vacated on the appointment of Henley as President of the Board of Trade

 

Note (1852): The minimum possible turnout is estimated by dividing the number of votes cast by three. To the extent that electors did not use all their three possible votes the figure given will be an underestimate of the true turnout

 Seat vacated on the appointment of Henley as President of the Board of Trade

Elections in the 1860s
 Death of Harcourt

 The Reform Act 1867 expanded the electorate and introduced the limited vote for three seat constituencies (reducing the maximum number of votes per elector from three to two).

Elections in the 1870s

 Seat vacated on the resignation of Henley

Elections in the 1880s

 Electorate expanded by the Representation of the People Act 1884 and constituency split into single member divisions by the Redistribution of Seats Act 1885, with effect from the 1885 United Kingdom general election.

See also

List of former United Kingdom Parliament constituencies

Sources

References
 Boundaries of Parliamentary Constituencies 1885–1972, compiled and edited by F.W.S. Craig (Parliamentary Reference Publications 1972)
 British Parliamentary Election Results 1832–1885, compiled and edited by F.W.S. Craig (Macmillan Press 1977)
 The House of Commons 1754–1790, by Sir Lewis Namier and John Brooke (HMSO 1964)
 The Parliaments of England by Henry Stooks Smith (1st edition published in three volumes 1844–50), second edition edited (in one volume) by F.W.S. Craig (Political Reference Publications 1973)) out of copyright
 Who's Who of British Members of Parliament: Volume I 1832–1885, edited by M. Stenton (The Harvester Press 1976)
 Who's Who of British Members of Parliament, Volume II 1886–1918, edited by M. Stenton and S. Lees (Harvester Press 1978)
 Concise Dictionary of National Biography (1930)
 List of members nominated for Parliament of 1653 at British History Online
D Brunton & D H Pennington, Members of the Long Parliament (London: George Allen & Unwin, 1954)
 John Cannon, Parliamentary Reform 1640–1832 (Cambridge: Cambridge University Press, 1972)
Cobbett's Parliamentary history of England, from the Norman Conquest in 1066 to the year 1803 (London: Thomas Hansard, 1808) 
 Maija Jansson (ed.), Proceedings in Parliament, 1614 (House of Commons) (Philadelphia: American Philosophical Society, 1988) 
 J. E. Neale, The Elizabethan House of Commons (London: Jonathan Cape, 1949)

Notes

Parliamentary constituencies in Oxfordshire (historic)
Constituencies of the Parliament of the United Kingdom established in 1290
Constituencies of the Parliament of the United Kingdom disestablished in 1885